Supermercados Econo is a Puerto Rican supermarket chain. As of 2021, it has 64 stores in 49 municipalities across the country.

Singer Bad Bunny previously worked at an Econo supermarket.

History
Supermercados Econo started operations in 1970 and its headquarters are in Carolina.

The chain's first store was opened by Facundo Colon, a Puerto Rican businessman, at Hato Rey. In 1978, a store was opened at Plaza Carolina, a large mall in Carolina. The Plaza Carolina location is still open.

In March 2020 the supermarket chain announced as a result of the COVID-19 pandemic  the first hour of operation would be exclusively for elderly customers. 

In 2020 the chain celebrated its 50th anniversary by giving out $200,000 in cash prizes.

During 2022, several allegations were made against the supermarket concerning their sales of meat and refrigerated products, including that their Aguadilla location was selling old, rotten meats. The Aguadilla location was temporarily closed.

See also
 Supermercados Selectos - another Puerto Rican supermarket chain with similar business model

References

External links
 

1970 establishments in Puerto Rico
Puerto Rican brands
Retail companies established in 1970
Food and drink companies of Puerto Rico
Supermarkets of Puerto Rico